Necroshine is the tenth studio album by thrash metal band Overkill released on February 23, 1999, on CMC International records.

It is the first Overkill album to feature a guest vocalist, with singer Blitz's sister Mary Ellsworth performing background vocals on "Let Us Prey" and a duet with Blitz on "Revelation". The title track is an almost permanent addition to Overkill's live set, being played at almost every live performance since its release. Necroshine was reissued along with From the Underground and Below (1998) as part of a box set in 2003. As of November 1999, Necroshine sold over 20,500 copies in the United States.

Necroshine marked the first time in Overkill's career that they did not make any personnel changes after more than two studio albums, although guitarist Sebastian Marino left the band shortly before its release.

Track listing

Personnel
Bobby "Blitz" Ellsworth – lead vocals
D.D. Verni – bass, backing vocals
Sebastian Marino – lead guitar
Joe Comeau – rhythm guitar, backing vocals
Tim Mallare – drums

Additional personnel
 Produced and mixed by Overkill and Andy Katz
 Additional vocals by Mary Ellsworth
 Engineered by Andy Katz
 Mastered by Roger Lian at Masterdisk
 Pre-production at Gear Rehearsal Studios, Shrewsbury, New Jersey, USA

Charts

References

External links
 Official OVERKILL Site

Overkill (band) albums
1999 albums
CMC International albums
Albums with cover art by Travis Smith (artist)